The Feroz Award for Best Comedy Film (Spanish: Premio Feroz a la mejor comedia) is one of the annual awards given at the Feroz Awards, presented by the Asociación de Informadores Cinematográficos de España. It was first presented in 2014.

Winners and nominees
‡ - Goya Award for Best Film winner† - Goya Award for Best Film nominee

2010s

2020s

See also
 Goya Award for Best Film

References

External links
 Official website

Feroz Awards
2014 establishments in Spain
Awards established in 2014
Awards for best film